The René Konen Tunnel, colloquially known as the Saint Esprit Tunnel, is a  road tunnel in Luxembourg City in southern Luxembourg.  It carries two lanes of one-way traffic northwards, under Ville Haute, bypassing the narrow streets and pedestrian zone in the heart of the city.

At the southern end, the tunnel is fed by the Passerelle, which carries traffic from Gare, on the southern side of the Pétrusse valley. The tunnel's entrance is under the Judiciary City.  At 100 metres (330 ft), the tunnel bears to its right, passes under the Chambre des Députés and heads back to the left in a long, sweeping bend.  At its northern end, the tunnel emerges just to the west of the Alzette valley.  The road onto which it leads then divides into two, feeding the Boulevard Royal to the west and the Côte d'Eich to the north.

On November 5, 1998, it was officially named after René Konen, a member of the Democratic Party, who served from 1979 until 1984 as Minister for Public Works in the Pierre Werner cabinet, and who initiated the tunnel's construction.

Footnotes

External links
 Arrêté ministériel du 5 novembre 1998 portant dénomination de la jonction souterraine entre le Viaduc et la Côte d’Eich 
 

Tunnels in Luxembourg
Buildings and structures in Luxembourg City
Transport in Luxembourg City
Road tunnels